Mariana Levy (22 April 1966 – 29 April 2005) was a Mexican telenovela actress, singer and television show host. She was the daughter of actress Talina Fernández and banker Gerardo Jorge Levy.

Biography
Mariana Levy Fernández was born in Mexico City. By the time she turned sixteen in 1982, she participated in her first Televisa soap opera, Vivir Enamorada ("Living in Love"), where she played "Verónica". Levy took 1983 off, then returned to the small screen in 1984, in a major Televisa hit, Los Años Felices ("The Happy Years"). In Los Años Felices, she played the role of "Nancy". Her next telenovela, Martín Garatuza (1986) was not successful. The opposite can be said of her next work, as "Linda", in 1987's Rosa Salvaje ("Wild Rosa"). Rosa Salvaje, about a girl named Rosa who falls in love with a millionaire but was not accepted by his family, became a hit all over Latin America, Europe and Asia. Levy became known in places including Spain, Puerto Rico, Russia, Venezuela and Argentina.

She participated in 1988's Lo Blanco y Lo Negro ("What's White and What's Black"), alongside Rafael Sánchez Navarro among others, as "Alma de Castro". She took off the rest of the 1980s, but, in 1990, she returned to television with the task of playing three characters in the same soap opera; playing "Ángela", "Gimena" and "Estrella" in Yo compro esa mujer ("I'll buy that woman").

She married again, this time to José María Fernández, the half brother of Chantal Andere. In 2003, Mariana Levy joined her mother, Talina Fernández, as cohost of her televised variety show, Nuestra Casa ("Our House"), and also participated in her final telenovela, the hugely successful Amor Real. This production was set in the mid 19th century, and in one of her most memorable characters ever, Mariana played "Josefina", an ugly-duckling-turned-swan character. Levy retired to give birth to Paula and José Emilio

Television roles

External links

Mariana Levy at the Alma-Latina.com

1966 births
2005 deaths
Mexican child actresses
Mexican telenovela actresses
Mexican television actresses
Mexican film actresses
Mexican stage actresses
Mexican television talk show hosts
20th-century Mexican actresses
21st-century Mexican actresses
Actresses from Mexico City
Singers from Mexico City
Hispanic and Latino American actresses
Mexican people of Turkish-Jewish descent
20th-century Mexican women singers
Mexican women television presenters
21st-century American women